Jennifer Kanis (born 16 April 1970) is an Australian politician. She was the Labor Party member for Melbourne in the Victorian Legislative Assembly between 2012 and 2014.

Kanis was born in Melbourne to migrant parents—a Greek father and Italian mother. She studied an Arts degree at the University of Melbourne, and also gained postgraduate qualifications in education. She worked as an English and literature teacher, and then enrolled to study industrial law at La Trobe University. After graduation, she took a job with Holding Redlich—the law firm founded by former Victorian Labor leader Clyde Holding—and became a senior associate of the firm. In 2008, she was elected to Melbourne City Council.

In 2012, Kanis was preselected as the Labor candidate for the Melbourne by-election triggered by the resignation of Bronwyn Pike. Kanis retained the seat for Labor on a 51.5 per cent (–4.7) two-candidate vote against Greens candidate and fellow Melbourne City councillor Cathy Oke. At the 2014 election Greens candidate Ellen Sandell defeated Kanis with a 52.4 per cent two-candidate vote.

References

External links

1970 births
Living people
Members of the Victorian Legislative Assembly
Australian Labor Party members of the Parliament of Victoria
Victoria (Australia) local councillors
Melbourne Law School alumni
La Trobe University alumni
Politicians from Melbourne
Australian schoolteachers
Lawyers from Melbourne
Australian people of Greek descent
Australian politicians of Italian descent
21st-century Australian politicians
Women members of the Victorian Legislative Assembly
Women local councillors in Australia
Labor Left politicians
21st-century Australian women politicians